Maggie Lloyd Williams (born 1975), is a Zimbabwe actress and author. She is best known for the roles in the television serials such as Silent Witness, Secret Diary of a Call Girl, Red Cap and The Low Down.

Personal life
She was born in 1975 in Masvingo, Zimbabwe.

Filmography

See also
 Sparkleshark

References

External links
 

Living people
21st-century Zimbabwean actresses
1975 births
Zimbabwean television actresses